The Dutch artist Angelique Houtkamp is known as both a tattoo artist and a studio artist as well as an entrepreneur. She was born in 1968 in a town near Amsterdam, but it was the capital city where she has developed her career. She is known mostly for her vintage portraits of women in both her tattoos as well and her paintings. These works have now garnered an international cult following in popular culture, made up of people who love the artist almost as much as the work itself. Houtkamp’s artwork has appeared in a multitude of various art institutes, magazines, books, and tattoo shows over the years of her professional career as an artist. However, despite her artistic success, there was a period of twelve years where she worked an assortment of different occupations before she opened her own tattoo parlour and became a publicized artist.

Early life 
Angelique Houtkamp was born in 1968 in a town just outside of Amsterdam called Uithoorn. She spent the years of her early life in an average education system until she decided to drop out in 1986 at the age of eighteen and move to Amsterdam. There, she expanded her experience in many different professions. She worked as a dressmaker, bartender, makeup artist, jewellery piercer, waitress, and as an administrator for a chain of sex shops. She also started up her own jewellery business when she was 23 called “Goldies”. Her personal life was just as interesting and diverse. Houtkamp was a member of two different Dutch bands: "Facehugger," a death metal group for which she was the bassist, and another band named the "Slick Mechanics", where she played as a guitarist. She also starred as the character Rumpelstiltskin for a Dutch children’s movie named “Er Wasus…”. This was not the last time she appeared behind a camera. In 1998, Houtkamp developed her skill as a tattoo artist and a year later turned this into a full-time career, thus launching her popularity in the professional arts. In 2001, she appeared in numerous TV shows to speak about tattooing. After this, her art began to gain even more popularity and she established a place for her work in the fine art sphere.

Tattoo profession 
Tattoo culture was never a clearly pronounced influence in the early years of Houtkamp’s life. The only interaction the artist had with the medium was with an old-fashioned snake-and-dagger tattoo that belonged to her uncle. Her uncle conceded his regrets towards getting the tattoo, but a young Houtkamp saw the mystic snake and ancient weapon as a fascinating aesthetic. Later in her life, Houtkamp’s interaction with tattoo culture became more prominent. After about twelve years of working a collection of odd jobs, she decided to learn tattooing in 1998. Only one year after this, she received a job tattooing at Tattoo Peter, one of the original tattoo parlours in Europe. The job at Tattoo Peter was a platform for Houtkamp to start her career. She later left Tattoo Peter and started her own parlour with the name Salon Serpent in Amsterdam, where she works alongside seven other artists. In the mind of Houtkamp, tattoos are connected with emotions pertaining to attraction, repellency, life, death, fear, and power. These motifs are made with vintage iconographs from old tattoo imagery and historical aesthetics. The popularity of Houtkamp’s skilled tattoos has captured the attention of multiple tattoo conventions, magazines, and art culture interviewers. Some of her more notable features are in articles of the publications of ITA and Penthouse, as well as Juxtapoz Art and Culture Magazine. She has also appeared at a variety of tattoo conventions and shows such as the London Tattoo Convention in 2012 and the exhibition at the Dva Gallery in Chicago in 2007.

Studio art profession 
Angelique Houtkamp began painting studio art with oil and acrylic, but in 2009, she switched to watercolour, pen, and ink as her new personal medium of choice. Her watercolour pieces are her more popular works and have gained a large fan following. She was first a self-taught artist until she learned the skills of watercolour from the artist Theo Jak, who was a student under Henry Goldfield. The techniques she used were typically used to create flash images for tattoo ideas in parlours, but Houtkamp has adapted the images into prints that have extended out of the parlour and into gallery spaces. The act of transferring body art onto paper allows Houtkamp’s work to be more accessible to public viewers. Her prints have appeared in sold out shows around the world, including in the Nelly Duff Gallery in London and in a group show put together by curator Miss Van in Barcelona, as well as in an ongoing residency with Outré Gallery in Melbourne, Australia. Her paintings have also been used for magazines, postcards, clothing, and CD covers. The artist does not only limit herself to painting but works with sculptural mediums as well. From 2005 and onward, Houtkamp has made a collection of evocative skulls. The pieces are created by using the skull of a human embryo to make molds using Plaster of Paris. She then soaks the plaster in coffee to conjure a vintage look before applying oil paint in decorative motifs that connect the pieces to her tattoo aesthetic.

Artistic process and style 
Houtkamp’s retro feminine images are devised from an assorted number of inspirations and artistic processes. The inspiration for her portraits comes from a varying number of antique aesthetics and from characteristics of Greek mythology to the Weimar Period, as well as from historic outsiders such as circuses, pirates, and gypsies. Her paintings and tattoos have also evoked a sentimentality for the 1920s flapper styles and pinup girls but with a femme fatale edge. The desired effect of her vintage motifs connects her art to themes of immortality, life, death, pop culture, and nostalgia. Her portraits have been described in many ways, from neo-femme to indirectly nostalgic to retro and vintage. Houtkamp’s portrayals have a tendency to resemble old school tattoo flash, such as her adaptations of the Wild West, old Hollywood, hybrid creatures, and nautical symbols, thus showing her paintings’ connections to her tattoo profession. An aesthetic connection to tattoo is also seen in the bold lines used to outline her images which she shades in with a limited colour palette. These techniques create a vintage style that Houtkamp further emphasizes by browning her paper with a coffee wash. To brighten the images, she pays careful attention to the effects of light on her figures that allow them to stand out of their antiquated visage. Houtkamp’s process for making her paintings starts with a hand drawing of her design. She then scans the image and adjusts proportions and lines using Photoshop, while also using the program to plan out the painting’s colour scheme and lighting composition. Before the genesis of this technology, Houtkamp would scan her images and, using a photocopier, copy and paste her images to create the desired outcome. Now, when she has completed her first draft of the image, she uses her artistic blueprint to hand paint the final product. To provide gallery accessible pieces, she creates a copy using giclee printing technology to obtain the best resolution for resale showing her watercolour methods.

Other commitments and personal ventures 
Houtkamp’s growing profession in the arts is not only attributed to her studio art and tattoo art. She has engaged in a multitude of various other professional and personal commitments that have increased her visibility. Through her partnership with Outré Gallery in Melbourne, Australia, Houtkamp has had two monographs published about her and her work. The first is “Tattoo Darling: The Art of Angelique Houtkamp”, published in 2007, and the second is “Tattoo Mystique: The Art and World of Angelique Houtkamp”, published in 2009. She is also featured in Outré’s publication of “Tattoo Parlour: Artists from the World of Tattoo”. Other art and culture publications have also picked up the artist’s talent, including Juxtapoz Art and Culture Magazine, which published a feature of Houtkamp and her work in the book “Juxtapoz Tattoo 2”. Extending her artistic creativity to other media, the artist has taken her talents to other entrepreneur ventures. She has started up her own greeting card collection named “Dearest Darling” and in 2004, she co-designed a bag and shoe line called “Helena-Angelique”. A year after this, she took her talents to a Dutch wallpaper company where she designed arrangements for the products. Houtkamp’s crafty inventions are seen to be mirrored in her everyday life, which is surrounded by a world of vintage ephemera. The personal style of the artist mimics the retro yet modern edged aesthetic of her portraits, made apparent by her fashion and abundance of tattoos. The personality and countenance of Houtkamp is part of what makes her art so relatable and what makes so many members of her audience connect with both her style and her artwork.

References 

1968 births
Living people
Dutch tattoo artists
21st-century Dutch painters